Edward Christopher Egerton (27 July 1816 – 27 August 1869) was a British Conservative politician from the Egerton family.

Background
Egerton was the son of Wilbraham Egerton and Elizabeth, daughter of Sir Christopher Sykes, 2nd Baronet. William Egerton, 1st Baron Egerton, was his elder brother.

Political career
Egerton sat as Member of Parliament for Macclesfield from 1852 to 1868 and for Cheshire East from 1868 to 1869. He served under the Earl of Derby and later Benjamin Disraeli as Parliamentary Under-Secretary of State for Foreign Affairs between 1866 and 1868.

Family
Egerton married Lady Mary Frances, daughter of Charles Pierrepont, 2nd Earl Manvers, in 1845. Together they had two sons:

Hugh Edward,
Charles Augustus (24 Aug. 1846-13 Oct. 1912), who married Lady Mabel Annie Brassey, daughter of Thomas Brassey, 1st Earl Brassey and Lady Anna Allnutt. They had five children including Vice-Adm. Henry Egerton who married Marion France Theresa Beckett, the daughter of Sir William Gervase Beckett, 1st Baronet and sister-in-law to Prime Minister Anthony Eden.

He died in August 1869, aged 53. Lady Mary remained a widow until her death in June 1905.

References

External links 

1816 births
1869 deaths
Edward
Conservative Party (UK) MPs for English constituencies
UK MPs 1852–1857
UK MPs 1857–1859
UK MPs 1859–1865
UK MPs 1865–1868
UK MPs 1868–1874